The 1975–76 NBA season was the Kings 27th season in the NBA and their fourth season in the city of Kansas City.

Roster

Regular season

Season standings

z – clinched division title
y – clinched division title
x – clinched playoff spot

Record vs. opponents

Awards and records
 Nate Archibald, All-NBA First Team

References

Sacramento Kings seasons
Kansas City
Kansas
Kansas